Bromodomain testis-specific protein is a protein that in humans is encoded by the BRDT gene. It is a member of the Bromodomain and Extra-terminal motif (BET) protein family.

BRDT is similar to the RING3 protein family. It possesses 2 bromodomain motifs and a PEST sequence (a cluster of proline, glutamic acid, serine, and threonine residues), characteristic of proteins that undergo rapid intracellular degradation. The bromodomain is found in proteins that regulate transcription. Two transcript variants encoding the same protein have been found for this gene.

The use of three different mouse models (Brdt knock-out mice, mice expressing a non-functional Brdt and mice expressing a mutated Brdt lacking its first bromodomain) showed that Brdt drives a meiotic and post-meiotic gene expression program. It also controls the genome-wide post-meiotic genome reorganization that occurs after histone hyperacetylation in elongating spermatids.

Model organisms

Model organisms have been used in the study of BRDT function. A conditional knockout mouse line, called Brdttm1a(EUCOMM)Wtsi was generated as part of the International Knockout Mouse Consortium program — a high-throughput mutagenesis project to generate and distribute animal models of disease to interested scientists.

Male and female animals underwent a standardized phenotypic screen to determine the effects of deletion. Twenty five tests were carried out on mutant mice and two significant abnormalities were observed. Homozygous mutant males were sub-fertile and both sexes had a decreased number of lumbar and sacral vertebrae.

Potential as target of male contraceptive medication
BET inhibitors such as JQ1 block the region of BRDT responsible for chromatin binding, and cause a reversible reduction of sperm production, sperm quality, and size of the testis in mice.
The mechanism of action of JQ1 could be explained by considering Brdt’s functions as a driver of testis-specific gene expression and post-meiotic chromatin reorganization. As BET inhibitors also inhibit other BET proteins BRD2, BRD3, and BRD4, they are likely to have effects in people beyond temporary male sterility.

References

External links

Further reading

Genes mutated in mice